Romancing Mary Jane: A Year in the Life of a Failed Marijuana Grower  is a non-fiction book, written by Canadian writer Michael Poole, first published in 1998 by Greystone Books. In the book, the author chronicles the regrettable consequences of his decision to cultivate marijuana on a commercial level. Goodreads called the book, an "engaging blend of metaphysics, marijuana, and midlife crisis." A panel of Wilfrid Laurier University judges called Poole's writing, "sheer competence".

Awards and honours
Romancing Mary Jane received the 1998 "Edna Staebler Award for Creative Non-Fiction".

See also
List of Edna Staebler Award recipients
List of books about cannabis

References

External links
D&M Publishers Inc., Michael Poole, Home page, Retrieved 11/23/2012

Canadian non-fiction books
1998 non-fiction books
Cannabis cultivation
Non-fiction books about cannabis
Midlife crisis in fiction
1998 in cannabis
Canadian books about cannabis